is a girls' school in Sapporo, Hokkaido, Japan. It consists of a senior high school and junior high school.

History 
The school was established in 1925 in Sapporo.

References

External links 
 

High schools in Hokkaido